Khushpura is a village in the tehsil of Dahina, Rewari District, in the Gurgaon Division of the state of Haryana, India.

References 

Villages in Rewari district